The discovery of the 118 chemical elements known to exist as of 2023 is presented in chronological order. The elements are listed generally in the order in which each was first defined as the pure element, as the exact date of discovery of most elements cannot be accurately determined. There are plans to synthesize more elements, and it is not known how many elements are possible.

Each element's name, atomic number, year of first report, name of the discoverer, and notes related to the discovery are listed.

Periodic table of elements

Pre-modern and early modern discoveries

Modern discoveries
For 18th-century discoveries, around the time that Antoine Lavoisier first questioned the phlogiston theory, the recognition of a new "earth" has been regarded as being equivalent to the discovery of a new element (as was the general practice then).

Graphics

See also
 History of the periodic table
 Periodic table
 Extended periodic table
 The Mystery of Matter: Search for the Elements (2014/2015 PBS film)
 Transfermium Wars

References

External links
History of the Origin of the Chemical Elements and Their Discoverers Last updated by Boris Pritychenko on March 30, 2004
History of Elements of the Periodic Table
Timeline of Element Discoveries
The Historyscoper
Discovery of the Elements – The Movie – YouTube (1:18)
The History Of Metals Timeline. A timeline showing the discovery of metals and the development of metallurgy.
—Eric Scerri, 2007, The periodic table: Its story and its significance, Oxford University Press, New York, 

Elements, discoveries
Timeline
History of chemistry
History of physics
Discovery